Ronald Russell King (19 August 1909 – 10 January 1988) was a New Zealand rugby union player. 

King was born in 1909, and he received his education at Hokitika District High School. A lock, King represented West Coast at a provincial level, and was a member of the New Zealand national side, the All Blacks, from 1934 to 1938. He played 42 matches for the All Blacks including 13 internationals. He captained the side in the three tests against South Africa in 1937. Between 1957 and 1960 King was a New Zealand selector.

References

See also

1909 births
1988 deaths
Rugby union players from West Coast, New Zealand
New Zealand rugby union players
New Zealand international rugby union players
Rugby union locks
New Zealand hoteliers
West Coast rugby union players
People educated at Westland High School, Hokitika